Purba Singhichhara is a village in Khowai district of Tripura state of India.

See also 
 Khowai district

References 

Villages in Khowai district